The Fort Worth Aviation Museum is an aviation museum located next to Meacham International Airport in  Fort Worth, Texas. The museum was rebranded in 2013 and was previously known as the Veterans Memorial Air Park.

Mission
The Fort Worth Aviation Museum (FWAM) is dedicated to preserving and promoting the history of aviation in Fort Worth, the North Texas region, and around the world. The museum displays aviation artifacts and provides historical interpretation on a variety of military topics. FWAM operates under the charter of the OV-10 Bronco Association, Inc., a 501(c)(3) not for profit corporation.

In addition to an air park with twenty-four airplanes, FWAM houses two museums. Along with the B-36 Peacemaker Museum, the Forward Air Controllers' Museum tells the stories of Forward Air Control (FAC) used in Close Air Support (CAS), the history of the North American Rockwell OV-10 Bronco, and the history of aviation in North Texas with an emphasis on Air Force Plant #4 (now known as Lockheed Martin).

FWAM's motto is "Bringing Aviation History to Life", and its mission is summarized as "Preservation, Inspiration, Education", or PIE.

Aircraft
The VMAP aircraft collection consists of twenty-five warbirds dating from 1943 to the present:

Programs

Landmark and Historic Sites Report 

To expand community knowledge of aviation and it cultural and economic impacts on North Texas, the FWAM prepared a list of North Texas Aviation Landmarks and Sites. The list outlines twenty-five of some of the more important sites and presents a priority for officially recognizing those locations.

First Flight Park 

The Museum worked with the City of Fort Worth to establish First Flight Park in August 2013.  The park is near the site of the first powered aircraft flight in Fort Worth by Roland Garros and the Moisant International Aviators in January 1911.  A Texas Historical Commission marker was placed on the site in January 2014.

Historic Aviation Preservation Project
VMAP promotes the rich aviation heritage of the North Texas region through the Historic Aviation Preservation Project, or HAPP.  VMAP is actively involved with the City of Fort Worth to identify and preserve areas, items and landmarks of significance to the history of aviation in North Texas and show how aviation transformed the region from cattle and oil into one of the premier aviation centers of the world. This includes cataloging and preserving items acquired from the recently defunct Fort Worth Air and Space Museum Foundation.

Aviation Book Fair
In partnership with the Fort Worth Public Library, FWAM sponsors an annual book fair called "Women, Pilots, and Writers in Aviation." Many of the featured authors are on hand to sign books and talk about their work.

BroncoFest
FWAM holds an annual reunion for Forward Air Controllers and Pilots who flew in the OV-10 Bronco.

See also
 Vintage Flying Museum

References

External links

Aerospace museums in Texas
Museums in Fort Worth, Texas
Military and war museums in Texas